"Stay" is a song by English musical duo Hurts from their debut album, Happiness. It was released as the album's third single in the United Kingdom on 15 November 2010. The song is the soundtrack to the German film Kokowääh, and was included in the Les Mills International BodyBalance (BodyFlow in the US/Canada) fitness program as Track 8 - Twists for Release 53.

Reception
STAR Magazine gave the song 5 stars out of 5 and stated "We’re not quite sure how music so gloomy can still manage to be so bloody gorgeous. But this synth duo’s inspired way with a simple melody, romantic lyrics and Theo Hutchcraft’s richly heartfelt vocals somehow build this electro-pop ballad into a truly beautiful elegy to lost love. Stunning!".

Music video

The video, directed by Dave Ma and shot on locations in Iceland, depicts Hurts singer Theo Hutchcraft and Icelandic model/actress Anna Thora Alfreds as lovers facing the end of their relationship. The two characters – both smartly dressed – appear to emerge from the sea and then walk on a bleak shore under a grey sky, until only Theo features in the final scene, alone. The video is intercut with scenes of Hutchcraft and band-mate Adam Anderson performing inside a shed and Anderson playing the piano on the wind-battered beach, alongside a group of female dancers singing the backing vocals.
Director Ma described how, on the day of the shooting, "the clouds rolled in as the perfect moody cover and everything looked amazing. But it was freezing, and the dancers, actress and Adam and Theo from Hurts did amazingly well to look somewhat composed in near subzero temperatures." During the filming of the last scene, Anna Thora broke and dislocated her knee cap and was nearly pulled out to sea after a wave hit her and Theo.

Track listing

CD single
"Stay" – 3:55
"Confide in Me" (Live from Reykjavik) – 3:53

7" single
"Stay" – 3:55
"Stay" (Groove Armada Remix) – 7:29

Digital EP
"Stay" - 3:55
"Stay" (Groove Armada Remix) – 7:29
"Stay" (Full Intention Club Mix) – 6:10

UK digital single
"Stay" (The Temper Trap Remix) – 4:25

German digital EP
"Stay"
"Stay" (Groove Armada Remix)
"Stay" (Full Intention Club Mix)
"Stay" (Oliver Koletzki Remix)

German CD-Single
"Stay"
"Stay" (Groove Armada Remix)
"Stay" (Full Intention Club Mix)
"Confide in Me" (Live from Reykjavik)

Personnel
Songwriting – Hurts
Production, instruments, programming – Hurts, Jonas Quant
Choir – Tina Sunnero, Jennifer Götvall, Karianne Arvidsson, Malin Abrahamsson

Source:

Charts

Weekly charts

Year-end charts

Certifications

Release history

References

2010 singles
2010 songs
Hurts songs
RCA Records singles
Rock ballads
Synth-pop ballads
2010s ballads
Music videos shot in Iceland